Kevin Edward McCadam (born March 6, 1979) is an American football safety in the National Football League who is a Free agent. He was drafted by the Atlanta Falcons in the fifth round (148th overall) of the 2002 NFL Draft. He graduated from Virginia Tech after playing college football at Grossmont College and Colorado State University. He attended El Capitan High School in Lakeside, California (1997).

After four seasons with the Falcons, he signed with the Panthers as an unrestricted free agent in 2006.

He was signed by the Jacksonville Jaguars on March 27, 2007. He was released on August 13, 2007.

His brother-in-law is former NBA player Chris Quinn.

References

External links
NFL profile

1979 births
Living people
People from La Mesa, California
American football safeties
Colorado State Rams football players
Grossmont Griffins football players
Virginia Tech Hokies football players
Atlanta Falcons players
Carolina Panthers players
Jacksonville Jaguars players
Players of American football from California
Sportspeople from San Diego County, California